Business US Route 83-S (Bus. US 83-S) is a business loop of US 83 in the Lower Rio Grande Valley region of Texas. The highway serves as the main street for many communities in the area, such as McAllen, Mission, San Juan, Alamo, and more.
This is the longest business loop in Texas, traveling almost 47 miles and is the third longest bannered US highway in the state; only US 90 Alternate and US 77 Alternate are longer.

Route description

Bus. US 83-S begins at Interstate 2/US 83 in Harlingen, near the interchange with Interstate 69E/US 77. Leaving the city, the highway serves the town of La Feria, before entering into Mercedes. In the city of Weslaco, the highway passes by the South Texas College - Mid-Valley Campus. Bus. US 83-S next passes through the towns of Donna, Alamo, and San Juan before entering Pharr. In Pharr, the highway intersects US 281, just south of Interstate 69C. Crossing I-2/US 83 for the first time since Harlingen, Bus. US 83-S enters into the city of McAllen. The highway serves as the major east-west road for the city, traveling directly through the city center. In Mission, the highway splits into a one way street, with northbound traffic traveling on Tom Landry Street and southbound on 9th Street. In western Mission, the highway crosses I-2/US 83 again. After the intersection with FM 2062, development along the route begins to drop, traveling mainly through more rural areas of the city. Bus. US 83-S ends at I-2/US 83 on the eastern edge of Peñitas, where I-2 also ends.

History
The highway was formally signed as Loop 374 until 1991.

Loop 374

Texas State Highway Loop 374 is a former state highway loop that was located in Hidalgo and Cameron counties.

Loop 374 was designated in 1963, running from US 83 near the west city limit of Mission, eastward along the old location of US 83 to US 83 near the west city limit of Harlingen. Loop 374 was re-routed through Mission in 1987, with westbound traffic being re-routed onto Mayberry Road and Tom Landry Street near the town's central business district. The highway was cancelled and re-designated as Bus. US 83 in 1991.

Junction list

References

External links

Business (McAllen, Texas)
83 Business (McAllen)
Transportation in Cameron County, Texas
Transportation in Hidalgo County, Texas
83 Business (McAllen, Texas)
Transportation in McAllen, Texas
Harlingen, Texas
Mission, Texas
Pharr, Texas